Nikolaos "Nikos" Toskas (born 22 February 1952) is a retired Hellenic Army General and a politician currently serving as a Syriza member of the Hellenic Parliament for Athens B. He was Alternate Minister of Public Order and Citizen Protection since 23 September 2015 having previously been Deputy Minister of National Defense. He resigned from office on 3 August 2018.

References

1952 births
Living people
Greek MPs 2015 (February–August)
Greek MPs 2015–2019
Syriza politicians
Military personnel from Athens
Hellenic Army lieutenant generals
Politicians from Athens